MIDI beat clock, or simply MIDI clock, is a clock signal that is broadcast via MIDI to ensure that several MIDI-enabled devices such as a synthesizer or music sequencer stay in synchronization. Clock events are sent at a rate of 24 pulses per quarter note. Those pulses are used to maintain a synchronized tempo for synthesizers that have BPM-dependent voices and also for arpeggiator synchronization.

MIDI beat clock differs from MIDI timecode in that MIDI beat clock is tempo-dependent. 

Location information can be specified using MIDI Song Position Pointer (SPP, see below), although many simple MIDI devices ignore this message.

Messages
MIDI beat clock defines the following real-time messages:
 clock (decimal 248, hex 0xF8)
 start (decimal 250, hex 0xFA)
 continue (decimal 251, hex 0xFB)
 stop (decimal 252, hex 0xFC)
MIDI also specifies a System Common message called Song Position Pointer (SPP). SPP can be used in conjunction with the above realtime messages for complete sync. This message consists of 3 bytes; a status byte (decimal 242, hex 0xF2), followed by two 7-bit data bytes (least significant byte first) forming a 14-bit value which specifies the number of "MIDI beats" (1 MIDI beat = a 16th note = 6 clock pulses) since the start of the song.
This message only needs to be sent once if a jump to a different position in the song is needed. Thereafter only realtime clock messages need to be sent to advance the song position one tick at a time.

See also
DIN sync
PPQN
Word clock

External links
 Freeware to measure a midiclock beat signal
 MAX/MSP documentation to their sync~ object
 MIDI specification
 Summary of MIDI messages
 Song Position Pointer (SPP) 

Encodings
MIDI standards
Synchronization